Bodyweight exercises (also called bodyweight workouts) are strength training exercises that use an individual's own weight to provide resistance against gravity. Bodyweight exercises can enhance a range of biomotor abilities including strength, power, endurance, speed, flexibility, coordination and balance. Such strength training has become more popular among recreational and professional athletes. Bodyweight training uses simple abilities like pushing, pulling, squatting, bending, twisting and balancing. Movements such as the push-up, the pull-up, and the sit-up are among the most common bodyweight exercises.

Advantages 

While some exercises may require equipment, most bodyweight exercises require none. For exercises requiring equipment, common household items (such as a bath towel for towel curls) are often sufficient, or substitutes may be improvised (for example, using a horizontal tree branch to perform pull-ups). As such, bodyweight exercises are convenient while traveling or on vacation, when access to a gym or specialized equipment may not be available. Another advantage of bodyweight training is that it entails no cost.

Disadvantages 

As bodyweight exercises use an individual's own weight to provide movement resistance, the weight being lifted is never greater than one's own body weight, and this can limit new muscle growth. Other downsides are that bodyweight training may be daunting to novices and perceived as too easy for experienced athletes.

Bodyweight exercise for older adults 
Some bodyweight exercises have been shown to benefit not just the young, but elderly participants as well. Older people doing bodyweight exercises benefit through gains in muscle mass, in mobility, in bone density, as well as in reduced depression and improved sleep habits. It is also believed that bodyweight training may help diminish or even prevent cognitive decline as people age. In addition, the higher risk of falls seen in elderly people may be mitigated by bodyweight training. Exercises focusing on the legs and abdomen such as squats, lunges, and step ups are recommended to increase leg and core strength, in doing so, reduce the risk of falling. Bodyweight exercises provide multi-directional movement that mimics daily activities, and as such can be preferable to using weight machines.

See also 

 Calisthenics
 Circuit training
 General fitness training
 High-intensity interval training
 List of weight training exercises
 Physical fitness
 Plyometrics
 Power training
 Resistance training
 Street workout
 Stretching
 Strength training
 Supercompensation
 Suspension training
 Weight training

References 

 
Bodybuilding
Human body weight